Willie McIntyre (born 25 March 1960) is a Scottish novelist whose novels mix comedy, legal procedure, social comment and action. His debut novel was Relatively Guilty and subsequent works have included Duty Man, and Sharp Practice. He is a lawyer working in criminal defence.

Biography
McIntyre was born in Linlithgow attending Linlithgow Primary School and Linlithgow Academy. He studied law at the University of Edinburgh. He has been a partner of Russel + Aitken LLP since 1988.

McIntyre is married and has four sons. He writes in his spare time, blogs for the Scottish Legal News and coaches East Stirlingshire F.C.'s 1999 youth (under 16) football team.

Novelist

Best Defence Series

The protagonist is Robbie Munro, a Scots criminal defence lawyer who tends to do the wrong thing for the right reason or, failing which, for the right price. Robbie's office is situated in the Royal Burgh of Linlithgow; not a stone's throw from the birthplace of Mary Queen of Scots, but the action takes place throughout Scotland and further afield.

Based in Scotland and drawing on McIntyre's thirty years as a criminal defence lawyer, there is a rich vein of dry-humour running through the stories which he describes as an antidote to a tendency in crime/legal fiction these days to feature either a serial killer, dispatching people in ever more interesting and gory ways, or very serious lawyers who only ever seem to have one case on the go at any given time.

The protagonist, Robbie Munro, is very much a real life lawyer, constantly juggling a series of cases, battling with the Scottish Legal Aid Board and awkward clients, while trying to retain some form of personal life. One gets the distinct impression that McIntyre is not only writing about what he knows, but from the heart and, probably due to his own experiences, can't resist the occasional dig at the Scottish Government and what he sees as its constant meddling with the criminal justice system.

Notwithstanding their relatively light-hearted approach, the books open the lid on the Scottish courts, while dealing with some very serious issues. Each story raises an interesting philosophical or ethical question, such as, in the first book in the series, Relatively Guilty, what is crime, and does the end justify the means?

Though the plots are often complex, they are never confusing such is McIntyre's deftness of touch. The books have been well received by many fellow professionals, on both sides of the Bar, due to their accuracy in law and procedure and the main character's frank, if sardonic, view on the idiosyncrasies of Scots criminal justice system.

Bibliography

Fiction 

 Relatively Guilty, 2012 (Best Defence Ltd)
 Duty Man, 2012 (Best Defence Ltd)
 Sharp Practice, 2013 (Best Defence Ltd)
 Killer Contract, 2013 (Best Defence Ltd)
 Crime Fiction, 2014 (Best Defence Ltd)
 Last Will 2015 (Sandstone Press)
 Present Tense 2016 (Sandstone Press)
 Good News Bad News 2017 (Sandstone Press)
 Stitch Up 16 August 2018 (Sandstone Press)
 Fixed Odds 4 July 2019 (Sandstone Press)
 Bad debt 22 October 2020 (Sandstone Press)
 Best Defence 1 January 2022 (Amazon Publishing)

Nonfiction
 Alex Munro's Whisky Tour

Written by McIntyre's alter ego, a character from the fictional Best Defence Series, this is a guide to some of the best and most readily available Scots single malt whiskies.

Recurring characters
Some of the recurring characters in the Best Defence series are listed below:

 Robbie Munro, a Scots criminal defence lawyer
 Alex Munro, Robbie's father, ex-police officer, disapproving of his son's profession
 Malky Munro, Robbie's elder brother, former soccer legend and apple of his father's eye 
 Grace-Mary, Robbie's long suffering secretary.
 Jake Turpie, Robbie's landlord and well known local crook.
 Sheriff Albert Brechin, A judge with few doubts, and even fewer reasonable ones
 Fiona Faye Q.C., Robbie's first choice Silk, .
 Cameron Crowe Q.C. Advocate depute, 'Nosferatu in Pinstripes' 
 Sandy, Café owner and purveyor of West Lothian's finest bacon roll
 Jill Green, breaker of Robbie's heart
 Andy Ingram, Robbie's annoyingly ethical legal assistant
 Joanna Jordon, Robbie's new legal assistant
 Tina Munro, Robbie's surprise off-spring

Award nomination
 Relatively Guilty was shortlisted for the Dundee International Book Prize 2012.
 Bad Debt was longlisted for the McIlvanney Prize 2021.

References

External links
 
 Present Tense at The Journal 
 Present Tense
 Book review: Present Tense at The Scotsman 
 Publishers weekly

1960 births
Living people
People educated at Linlithgow Academy
People from Linlithgow
Scottish crime fiction writers
Scottish novelists
20th-century Scottish novelists
21st-century Scottish novelists
20th-century Scottish lawyers
Scottish lawyers
21st-century Scottish lawyers
Tartan Noir writers